Agilo was an Alemannic warrior. Originally tribunus stabuli (354) and then tribunus gentilium et scutariorum (354–360), he was promoted to magister peditum (360–362). During the reigns of Roman emperors Constantius II and Julian in the 4th century. Under Constantius he was sent to protect the frontier on the Tigris, while Julian appointed him to the Commission of Chalcedon but passed him over for military service. When Procopius attempted a coup against the emperor Valens in 365, he recruited Agilo back into military service, but eventually defected to the emperor in 366.

References

Bibliography 

 
 , in 
 
 
 Otto Seeck: Agilo. in: Paulys Realencyclopädie der classischen Altertumswissenschaft (RE). Band I,1, Stuttgart 1893, col. 809.

4th-century Germanic people
Alemannic warriors
Magistri peditum